Yanaraju (possibly Quechua for "black snow peak") may refer to:
 Contrahierbas, a mountain in Ancash, Peru; also called Yanaraju.
 Urus, a mountain in Ancash, Peru; also called Yanaraju.
 Yanamarey, a mountain in Ancash, Peru; also called Yanaraju.